Colin William Simson (1828 – 23 February 1905) was a Scottish-born Australian politician.

He was born at Pittenween in Fife to farmer Robert Simson. In 1851 he migrated to Victoria to follow the gold rush without success, then working as a pastoralist. By 1862 he was farming near Hay in New South Wales. On 3 December 1862 he married Marguerite Madeleine Smith, with whom he had nine children. He was elected to the New South Wales Legislative Assembly for Balranald in 1877, but he did not re-contest in 1880. Simson died at Geelong in 1905.

References

 

1828 births
1905 deaths
Members of the New South Wales Legislative Assembly
19th-century Australian politicians